The 2021 Nevada Wolf Pack football team represented the University of Nevada, Reno, in the 2021 NCAA Division I FBS football season. The Wolf Pack were led by fifth–year head coach Jay Norvell and played their home games at Mackay Stadium. They competed as members of the West Division of the Mountain West Conference.

Previous season

The Wolf Pack finished the 2020 season 7–2 and won the Famous Idaho Potato Bowl against Tulane by a score of 38–27.

Preseason

Award watch lists

Mountain West media days
The Mountain West media days were held on July 21–22, 2021, at the Cosmopolitan in Paradise, Nevada.

Media poll
The preseason poll was released on July 21, 2021. The Wolf Pack were predicted to finish in first place in the MW West Division.

Preseason All-Mountain West Team
The Wolf Pack had four players selected to the preseason All–Mountain West Team; three from the offense and one from the specialists.

Offense

Romeo Doubs – WR

Carson Strong – QB

Cole Turner – TE

Specialists

Brandon Talton – PK

Schedule

Source:

Rankings

Personnel

Depth chart

Game summaries

at California

Idaho State

at Kansas State

at Boise State

New Mexico State

Hawaii

at Fresno State

UNLV

San Jose State

at No. 22 San Diego State

Air Force

at Colorado State

References

Nevada
Nevada Wolf Pack football seasons
Nevada Wolf Pack football